Ja. Nee. Lekker is the fourth studio album from South African electronic rock group Die Heuwels Fantasties, released in 2014 by Supra Familias in South Africa.

Track listing

References

Die Heuwels Fantasties albums
2014 albums